Tamil Thai refers to the allegorical and sometimes anthropomorphic personification of the Tamil language as a mother. This allegory of the Tamil language in the persona of a mother was established during the Tamil renaissance movement of the latter half of the nineteenth century. The concept became popular in the Tamil-speaking world after the publication of a song invoking and praising Tamil mother in a play titled, "Manonmaniyam", written by Manonmaniam Sundaram Pillai (1855 – 1897) and published in 1891. Under the auspices of the DMK, the Tamil Thai Valthu, with music composed by M.S. Viswanathan, has since been adopted as the state song of the Government of Tamil Nadu.

Temple
Tamil Thai Kovil is a temple in which the presiding deity is Tamil Thai, representing the Tamil language. This temple, located in Karaikudi in Sivaganga district in Tamil Nadu, is the only temple in the world for worshipping a language as a god or goddess. The temple is situated inside the Kamban Mani Mandabam, and the street in which the temple is located has been named Tamil Thai Kovil Street.

The idea of establishing such a temple was conceived by Kamban Adippodi Saw Ganesan the founder of Kamban Kazhagam. The Tamil Thai temple was declared open in 1993, by Karunanidhi. The main shrine is for Tamil Thai. On either side of the idol of Tamil Thai, there are smaller idols of Agathiyar and Tolkappiyar. Outside the main shrine are icons of Oli Thai (the goddess of sound) and Vari Thai (the goddess of verses). There are separate enclosures for Kamban, Ilango Adigal, and Thiruvalluvar. V. Ganapati Sthapati, temple architect and builder from Karaikudi, designed, constructed, and did the sculpturing work of the temple.

The idol of Tamil Thai installed in the temple is not worshipped in the same way as the idols installed in other temples. The Tamil Thai  temple remains closed except during the Kamban Vila which happens during the month of April every year.

Statue 
In 1981, the then Tamil Nadu Government under M. G. Ramachandran had declared open a Tamil Thai statue in Madurai on the occasion of the Fifth World Tamil Conference, in January 1981.

On 14 May, 2013, J. Jayalalithaa, Chief Minister of Tamil Nadu, announced in the State Legislative Assembly that an over 300-feet high statue of Tamil Thai (தமிழ்த்தாய்) would be installed in Madurai at an approximate cost of Rs.100 crore. She also announced that the statue would be on the lines of the Statue of Liberty in New York City, but it was never built. The image of the proposed statue has also attracted some criticism for the likely implications of the underlying iconographic presuppositions.

Iconography
The goddess of Tamil Thai has been depicted variously in different media. Since the coinage of the concept and terminology of Tamil Thai by Manonmaniam Sundaram Pillai, the persona of Tamil Thai has been presented in a variety of ways in the print media via books, posters,  paintings, in textbook illustrations, advertisements, and cartoons. The depiction of this entity has been influenced by the Hindu goddess Saraswati, who has adopted some of her aspects, most significantly, her veena. Saraswati, often known in Tamil as Kalaimakal, has sometimes been represented as Tamil Thai's friend, who commands poets to sing to her in Tamil so that she could enjoy listening to the language, as well as offering her friend most of her iconography. Statues of Tamil Thai have been imagined and sculpted in several different forms. For example, in 1940, as directed by Ganesan, Vaidyanatha Stapathi created a panchaloha idol of Tamil Thai, depicting Tamil Thai as seated on a globe to indicate the geographical spread of Tamil. In this statue, Tamil Thai holds in her hands palm leaf manuscripts, a japa mala, the torch of knowledge, and a Sengottu yal. The statue installed to commemorate the Fifth International Tamil Conference, Madurai, 1981, depicts Tamil Thai in a seated position sitting on a lotus flower with one hand in the abhaya mudra. A nearly identical statue has been installed as the main idol in the Tamil Thai Temple in Karaikudi. In some areas, Andal is considered to be Tamil Thai, due to her contribution to Tamil literature. The statue proposed to be installed at Madurai represents Tamil Thai in a standing position.

See also
Tamil Thai Valthu (Puducherry)
Tamil Thai Valthu
Telugu Talli
Telangana Talli

Further reading
For a critical study on the visualization of the Tamil language as goddess, queen and mother, see: 
For the details of the different visual representation of Tamil Thai, see:

References

Karaikudi
Tamil language